Roger East (7 February 19228 December 1975) was an Australian journalist who was murdered by the Indonesian military during its invasion of East Timor in 1975.

East was a freelance journalist who worked for the Australian Associated Press (AAP). He travelled to Portuguese Timor (now known as East Timor) in October 1975, following the story of the Balibo Five, who had been killed by Indonesian soldiers just weeks before. East was captured by the Indonesian armed forces and was brought, along with many other prisoners, to the Dili waterfront where he and scores of others were then executed by firing squad.

Previously, he had worked as a publicity officer for the Australian Country Party in Queensland and had been working in Darwin as a press officer for the Darwin Reconstruction Commission (which was created after the devastation of Darwin by Cyclone Tracy in December 1974).

Early life 
He had two older brothers, Bill and Alan, and a younger sister, Glenise. East was a child of the Depression and his teenage years in the 1930s were difficult ones. During World War II, East served in the Royal Australian Navy spending most of his war service as a signalman on HMAS Burnie, a corvette, during the fall of Singapore and subsequent escort duties.

Career 
After the war, East entered journalism. Working at first in regional New South Wales newspapers, in the 1950s he left Australia to cover foreign events in places as varied as Cyprus, Africa, China and the Suez Crisis. In the 1960s, he went to work for Visnews (today Reuters Television) and as editor of an English language newspaper in Spain. East was quoted as stating that he experienced more freedom of the press in Spain under Franco than in Australia under Menzies. In the early 1970s he worked as a press officer for different organisations including both the Australian Country Party and the Australian Labor Party.

Investigating the Balibo Five 
At the time of East's arrival, East Timor was under the de facto government of Fretilin, a left-wing political party. The Portuguese governor had fled to the island of Atauro and was refusing to return to the capital, Dili. Fretilin issued a Unilateral declaration of independence from Portugal on 28 November 1975.

East was one of only three journalists in Timor — the other two were Michael Richardson, the South-East Asia correspondent for The Age and Jill Jolliffe, a freelancer who was then working for Reuters. When it became obvious that a full-scale invasion by Indonesia was imminent, Richardson and Jolliffe left with the Red Cross and went to Darwin. East, however, decided to remain in East Timor. He planned to retreat with the Fretilin forces to the mountains in the interior and report from there to the outside world through high frequency radio transmissions. East's last report for the ABC's Correspondents Report was heard on the afternoon of 7 December 1975.

He was captured by the Indonesians before he could get away. Eyewitnesses later reported that East was brought, along with many other prisoners, to the Dili waterfront, where he and scores of others were then executed by firing squad.

Following an inquest into the murder of the Balibo Five, there were calls for a similar inquest into the murder of East.

Media 
In Timothy Mo's novel The Redundancy of Courage, the character Bill Mabbely is based upon Roger East.

Anthony LaPaglia starred as East in the 2009 Australian feature film Balibo, which tells the story of the Balibo Five. The film was co-written by David Williamson and Robert Connolly and was based upon Cover-Up, a book by Jolliffe, as well as the work of Clinton Fernandes, who served as the film's historical consultant.

See also 
 Australia – East Timor relations

References

Further reading

External links 
 
 

1922 births
1975 deaths
Assassinated Australian journalists
Australian people murdered abroad
Royal Australian Navy personnel of World War II
Journalists killed while covering the Indonesian occupation of East Timor
20th-century Australian journalists
Royal Australian Navy sailors
Deaths by firearm in East Timor